Vladimír Bálek (born 8 March 1981) is a professional Czech football player who currently plays for SV Sierning in the Austrian Fourth Division.

Bálek returned to Bohemians after being the top scorer in the first half of the 2009–10 Czech 2. Liga, notching 13 goals in 16 appearances while playing for Vlašim.

References

External links
 
 Guardian Football
 
 Profile at Bohemians 1905 website

Czech footballers
1981 births
Living people
Czech First League players
SK Slavia Prague players
SFC Opava players
Bohemians 1905 players
FK Viktoria Žižkov players
FC Sellier & Bellot Vlašim players
Association football forwards
FK Čáslav players